Lorena Fabiana Colotta (born March 4, 1970), known professionally as Sabrina Sabrok, is an Argentine television host, cyberpunk rock singer, adult model, pornographic actress, and producer.

Discography
 Deal with the devil (2016)
 Dangerous love (2016)
 Antisocial EP (2009)
 Jugando Con Sangre (2008)
 Sabrina EP (2006)
 Sodomizado Estas (2002)
 Primeras  IV (2001)
 Primeras  III (1999)
 Primeras  II (1998)
 Primeras  (1997)

Television appearances
Sabrok has appeared in several television shows such as La hora pico (as a model), and the Mexican edition of the reality show Big Brother VIP. She hosted her own television show on TeleHit, called Sabrina, El Sexo en su Máxima Expresión or more commonly known simply as Sabrina. In 2015, Sabrok took part in the TV segment 'Te lo hundo y te mojas', alongside Andrea Rincon.

Personal life
Since 2016, Sabrok has been married to Alexandro Hernandez, a musician fifteen years her junior. Sabrok has two daughters, Dulcinea, from a previous relationship with Roberto Dubaz, and Metztli (who is deaf and is autistic), from her relationship with to Erick Farjeat. Both children live with their fathers. In 2020, she alleged that professional wrestler Cibernético was the biological father of her daughter, and not Farjeat.

References

External links

 
 
 "Sabrina Sabrok", Sabrina's Cyberpunk Band
 Sabrina's Television Show, retrieved Sept 19, 2008 at the Internet Archive 
 

1970 births
Argentine expatriates in Mexico
Argentine female models
Argentine film actresses
Argentine people of Italian descent
Argentine rock musicians
Argentine television personalities
Women television personalities
Big Brother (franchise) contestants
Cyberpunk music
Argentine LGBT rights activists
Nu metal singers
People from Buenos Aires
Living people